Visa requirements for Chinese citizens usually refers to visa requirements for People's Republic of China passport holders. It may also refer to:
Visa requirements for Chinese citizens of Hong Kong, visa requirements for Chinese citizens who are permanent residents of Hong Kong and hold Hong Kong passports
Visa requirements for Chinese citizens of Macau, visa requirements for Chinese citizens who are permanent residents of Macau and hold Macau passports
Visa requirements for Taiwanese citizens, visa requirements for Taiwan passport (issued by Republic of China) holders